The Malmö Concert Hall was a 1,200-seat concert hall located in Lugnet, a central neighbourhood in Malmö, Sweden.

It was the home of the Malmö Symphony Orchestra, before they moved to the newly built Malmö Live in 2015.

The building now houses the Swedish Public Employment Service.

References

Concert halls in Sweden
Buildings and structures in Malmö